Eugoa dissozona is a moth of the family Erebidae first described by Edward Meyrick in 1889. It is found in New Guinea.

References

dissozona
Moths described in 1889